Self-management may refer to:

 Self-care, when one's health is under individual control, deliberate, and self-initiated
 Self-medication, which includes both normal use of over-the-counter drugs and also some types of drug abuse
 Self-managed economy, based on autonomous self-regulating economic units and a decentralised mechanism of resource allocation and decision-making
 Self-management (computer science), process by which computer systems shall manage their own operation without human intervention
 Organizational self-management, a form of organizational management based on self-directed work processes 
 Socialist self-management, a social and economic model formulated by the Communist Party of Yugoslavia